Hansda is a surname. Notable people with the surname include: 

Birbaha Hansda, Indian actress
Chunibala Hansda, Indian politician
Digamber Hansda (1939–2020), Indian tribal activist
Lal Mohan Hansda (born 1983), Indian footballer
Matilal Hansda, Indian politician
Naren Hansda, Indian politician
Rupchand Hansda, Indian writer
Subodh Chandra Hansda (born 1927), Indian politician
Sukumar Hansda (1954–2020), Indian politician
Thomas Hansda, Indian politician